FC SKA-Alay Osh is a Kyrgyzstani football club based in Osh that plays in the top division  the Kyrgyzstan League.

History 
19??: Founded as FC Alay Gulcha.
1994: Renamed FC Alay-Oshpirim Gulcha.
1995: Renamed FC Alay Gulcha.
1998: Renamed FC SKA-Alay Osh.

Achievements 
Kyrgyzstan League:
5th place: 1996

Kyrgyzstan Cup:

Current squad

External links 
Career stats by KLISF

Football clubs in Kyrgyzstan